Case 219 is a 2010 American Drama film starring Evan Ross, Leven Rambin, and Taylor Nichols, and Harold Perrineau. The film was written and directed by James Bruce and is  based on the Walter Dean Myers novel Shooter.

Plot
Seventeen-year-old Leonard Grey (Brett Davern) went on a high school shooting rampage killing one student and injuring scores more before turning the gun on himself. Using documentary style interviews Case 219 examines the interconnected relationships among the shooter, his friends, their tormentors at school, and their parents. The film unfolds through the eyes of a Los Angeles Times journalist researching a story for the tenth anniversary of this tragedy and in watching the interviews we discover the reporters own shocking secret.

Cast

 Harold Perrineau- Franklyn Bonner
 Evan Ross- Cameron Porter
 Melora Walters- Victoria Lash
 Leven Rambin- Carla Evans
 Taylor Nichols- Richard Ewing
 Brett Davern- Leonard Gray
 John Nielsen- Det. Henry
 Natalie Smyka- Student
 Damone Williams- Student

Releases
The film has been screened at seven different film festivals, premiering at the Atlanta Film Festival.

References

External links
 
 

2010 films
2010 drama films
American drama films
2010s English-language films
2010s American films